Gasik is a rural locality (a selo) in Dzhuldzhagsky Selsoviet, Tabasaransky District, Republic of Dagestan, Russia. The population was 403 as of 2010.

Geography 
Gasik is located 15 km southwest of Khuchni (the district's administrative centre) by road. Kuvag is the nearest rural locality.

References 

Rural localities in Tabasaransky District